Leptobotia is a genus of fish in the family Botiidae endemic to China.

Species
There are currently 16 recognized species in this genus. In addition to these, Parabotia curtus was formerly included in Leptobotia.

 Leptobotia bellacauda Bohlen & Šlechtová, 2016
 Leptobotia brachycephala Guo & Zhang, 2021
 Leptobotia elongata (Bleeker, 1870)
 Leptobotia flavolineata Wang, 1981
 Leptobotia guilinensis Chen, 1980
 Leptobotia hengyangensis Huang & Zhang, 1986
 Leptobotia micra Bohlen & Slechtová, 2017
 Leptobotia microphthalma Fu & Ye, 1983
 Leptobotia orientalis Xu, Fang & Wang, 1981
 Leptobotia pellegrini Fang, 1936
 Leptobotia posterodorsalis Lan & Chen, 1992
 Leptobotia punctata Li, Li & Chen, 2008
 Leptobotia rubrilabris (Dabry de Thiersant, 1872)
 Leptobotia taeniops (Sauvage, 1878)
 Leptobotia tchangi Fang, 1936
 Leptobotia tientainensis (Wu, 1930)

References

Botiidae
Freshwater fish genera
Taxa named by Pieter Bleeker
Taxonomy articles created by Polbot